Willy Senn (born 25 February 1920) was a Swiss athlete. He competed in the men's shot put at the 1948 Summer Olympics.

References

External links
  

1920 births
Possibly living people
Athletes (track and field) at the 1948 Summer Olympics
Swiss male shot putters
Olympic athletes of Switzerland
Place of birth missing